Gerhard Hager (born 26 September 1942 in Vienna) is a former non-attached Member of the European Parliament representing Austria. His two European Parliamentary terms began on 11 November 1996 and 20 July 1999, culminating in his European Parliament career's ending on 19 July 2004.

Early life

Gerhard Hager was born on September 26, 1942 in Vienna, Austria as the nephew of Gustav Krist and grew up under the impressions of the aftermath of World War II. 
From 1948-1952 Hager attended primary school before attending another school from 1952-1960. After leaving school, Hager studied law at the University of Vienna, graduating from there in 1966.

Political career 
During the 1970s and 1980s, Hager served in positions such as a Judge of the High Court and President of the Senate. In 1991, he was appointed Councillor of the Supreme Court. He also worked as a lecturer at the University of Vienna.

In May 1994, the President accorded him the title of professor.

On November 11, 1996, Hager began his term as a Member of the European Parliament representing Austria. For most of his parliamentary term, Hager was a member of the right-wing populist Austrian Freedom Party, but left the party on February 14, 2003.

During his first term as a Member of the European Parliament, Hager served on the Committee on Institutional Affairs and the Committee on the Rules of Procedure, the Verification of Credentials and Immunities. During his second term, Hager participated in the Committee on Petitions, the Committee on Legal Affairs, the Committee on Industry, Research and Energy and the Committee on Constitutional Affairs, although, during Hager's time, most of these bore different names. At times, Hager served as a substitute on the Committee on Economic and Monetary Affairs and Industrial Policy and the Committee on Legal Affairs and the Internal Market.

Personal life 
While being retired since 2004, Hager occasionally holds literature presentations in front of small audiences. Besides, he spends his time exploring nature.

Hager is married, father of a son and owner of a female Parson Russell Terrier.

Publications

Technical 
 „Nichtigkeitsbeschwerde und Berufung“, Manz 1981 (together with attorney Dr. Meller). The second edition was published 2004 in cooperation with attorney Dr. Eichenseder.
 „Persönlichkeitsschutz im Straf- und Medienrecht“, Medien & Recht 1991 (second and third editions in cooperation with vice president of the Supreme Court, Dr. Walenta).
 „§§ 15 und 16 StGB“, Manz 1994 (in cooperation with Dr. Massauer)
 „Grundrechtsbeschwerdegesetz 1992", Manz 1998 (in cooperation with Dr. Holzweber)

Fiction 
 „Hager, Heiteres vom Höchstgericht“, Anekdoten; Manz 1995
 „Wie bring' ich meinen Mann ins Grab?“, Satire, OVG 2000
 „Am Brunnen weit vom Tore“, Erzählung, R.G. Fischer, 2003
 „ E rnstes und U nernstes rund um das Europäische Parlament“ Anekdoten, OVG 2004

References 

Politicians from Vienna
Freedom Party of Austria politicians
1942 births
Living people
Freedom Party of Austria MEPs
MEPs for Austria 1999–2004
21st-century Austrian politicians
MEPs for Austria 1996–1999